Kinn is a municipality in Vestland county, Norway. It was established on 1 January 2020. It is in the traditional districts of Nordfjord and Sunnfjord. The municipality is the only non-contiguous municipality in Norway since the municipality of Bremanger lies in between the north and south parts of Kinn. The administrative centres of the municipality is the two cities of Florø and Måløy. Some villages in the municipality include Rognaldsvåg, Stavang, Grov, Norddalsfjord, Nyttingnes, Steinhovden, Brandsøy, Deknepollen, Holvika, Kvalheim, Langeneset, Raudeberg, Refvika, Silda, Tennebø, Vedvika, and Vågsvåg.

Historically, there was another municipality of Kinn in Norway that existed from 1838 until 1964. The "old" Kinn roughly corresponded to the southern part of the "new" municipality of Kinn.

The  municipality is the 142nd largest by area out of the 356 municipalities in Norway. Kinn is the 74th most populous municipality in Norway with a population of 17,131.

The 2021 film Dune was partially filmed in Kinn, serving as House Atreides’ home world of Caladan.

General information
The municipality was established on 1 January 2020 when the old Flora Municipality was merged with most of Vågsøy Municipality (the rest of Vågsøy was merged into the new Stad Municipality).

Name
The municipality was named after the old municipality of Kinn which existed from 1838 to 1964. That municipality was named after the old Kinn farm on the island of Kinn since Kinn Church was located there. The name is identical with the word for "cheek", referring to the steep slope of a mountain on the island. Historically, the island's name was spelled Kind.

Coat of arms
Kinn adopted a new coat of arms that was designed and approved in the fall of 2019. The blue and white arms are an abstract design of the bow of a boat, an important symbol for the fishing community. The design is abstract and so it can also be seen as a rock, waves, or the head of a spear.

Churches
The Church of Norway has many churches in the municipality of Kinn which is part of the Diocese of Bjørgvin. There are four parishes in the Sunnfjord prosti (deanery) and one parish in the Nordfjord prosti (deanery).

Government
All municipalities in Norway, including Kinn, are responsible for primary education (through 10th grade), outpatient health services, senior citizen services, unemployment and other social services, zoning, economic development, and municipal roads. The municipality is governed by a municipal council of elected representatives, which in turn elects a mayor.  The municipality falls under the Sogn og Fjordane District Court and the Gulating Court of Appeal.

Municipal council
The municipal council  of Kinn is made up of 39 representatives that are elected to four year terms. The party breakdown is as follows:

Geography
The northern portion of Kinn Municipality includes the island of Vågsøy and a small portion of the mainland east of the island on northern and outer shore of the Nordfjorden. Other populated islands in this part of the municipality include Silda, Moldøen, and Husevågøy. The lake Degnepollvatnet is located between the villages of Degnepoll and Tennebø.

The southern portion of Kinn Municipality is located on the coast at the entrances to the Norddalsfjorden and Førdefjorden. It includes many islands, including Reksta, Askrova, Svanøya, Skorpa, Fanøya, Hovden, and Kinn. The municipality also includes the large lakes of Endestadvatnet, Lykkjebøvatnet, and Vassetevatnet. The Norddalsfjorden is crossed by the Norddalsfjord Bridge.

Climate 
Ytterøyane lighthouse in Kinn has been recording temperature since 1984, showing a temperate oceanic climate (marine west coast, Köppen: Cfb). The temperature range from the coldest month to the warmest month is only 11.2C. The coldest monthly mean is 3.4C, making this among the mildest winters in Scandinavia. The all-time high  was recorded July 2019, and the all-time low  was recorded February 2001. The average date for the first overnight freeze (below ) in autumn is December 6 at Ytterøyane (1981-2010 average). However, in 2015 there were no freezing lows at all.

Notable people 

 Ernst Sars (1835 in Kinn – 1917) a Norwegian professor, historian, author and editor
 Sigurd Høst (1866 in Flora – 1939) an educationalist, academic and school textbook writer 
 Martha Tynæs (1870 in Florø – 1930) a Norwegian feminist, social worker and politician
 Ivar Lykke Falch Lind (1870–1951) a jurist and politician, Mayor of Kinn in 1920s
 Thor Solberg (1893 in Florø – 1967) an aviation pioneer, flew from the US to Norway in 1935
 Arnvid Vasbotten (1903 in Florø – 1985) a jurist and politician for Nasjonal Samling
 Jon Tolaas (1939 in Vågsøy –2012) a Norwegian teacher, poet and novelist
 Dagfinn Hjertenes (1943 in Florø – 2006) a Norwegian politician, Mayor of Flora 1980s 
 Per Drageset (born 1944 in Raudeberg) a Norwegian civil servant, Assisting County Governor of Sogn og Fjordane
 Reidar Sandal (born 1949 in Vågsøy) a Norwegian politician
 Øyulf Hjertenes (born 1979 in Florø) a Norwegian economist, journalist and newspaper editor

Sport 
 Anne Grethe Jeppesen (born 1957 in Florø) a Norwegian sport shooter, competed at the 1984 Summer Olympics
 Margunn Haugenes (born 1970 in Florø) a Norwegian Olympic champion footballer
 Runar Hove (born 1995 in Florø) a Norwegian footballer with 160 club caps

Media gallery

References

 
Municipalities of Vestland
2020 establishments in Norway